Dream Street is an album by jazz singer Peggy Lee that was released in 1957.

Track listing

Personnel
 Peggy Lee – vocals
 Lou Levy – piano

References

1957 albums
Albums arranged by Sy Oliver
Albums conducted by Sy Oliver
Albums produced by Dave Cavanaugh
Decca Records albums
Peggy Lee albums

Albums recorded at Capitol Studios